Songs and Dances of Death (Pesni i plyaski smerti) is a song cycle for voice (usually bass or bass-baritone) and piano by Modest Petrovich Mussorgsky, written in the mid-1870s, to poems by Arseny Golenishchev-Kutuzov, a relative of the composer.

Each song deals with death in a poetic manner although the depictions are realistic in that they reflect experiences not uncommon in 19th century Russia: child death, death in youth, drunken misadventure and war.

The song cycle is considered Mussorgsky's masterpiece in the genre.

Songs
Songs and Dances of Death consists of four individual songs, as follows:

1. Lullaby (Колыбельная) (14 April 1875) (in F-sharp minor–A minor)
A mother cradles her sick infant, who grows more feverish. Death appears, disguised as a babysitter, and rocks the infant to eternal sleep.
2. Serenade (Серенада) (11 May 1875) (in E minor–E-flat minor)
The figure of Death waits outside the window of a dying woman, in the manner of a wooing lover.
3. Trepak (Трепак) (17 February 1875) (in D minor)
A drunken peasant stumbles outside into the snow and becomes caught in a blizzard. The figure of Death invites him to dance a folk-dance called the Trepak. As he freezes to death, he dreams of summer fields and doves.
4. The Field Marshal (Полководец) (5 June 1877) (in E-flat minor–D minor)
The figure of Death is depicted as an officer marshaling, illuminated by the moon, the dead troops of both armies after a dreadful and bloody battle. She tells them: in life you were enemies but now you are comrades, because you're all dead, and I am your commanding officer.  She assures them that although the living will forget about them, she will remember them, and will harden the earth above them so that they cannot be resurrected.

Recordings

The Songs and Dances of Death have been recorded by numerous vocalists, including Vladimir Rosing, George London, Ferruccio Furlanetto, Nicolai Ghiaurov, Boris Christoff, Kim Borg, Martti Talvela (twice: once with piano accompaniment and once with full orchestra), Matti Salminen, Anatoly Kotcherga, Paata Burchuladze, Aage Haugland, Dmitri Hvorostovsky, Ewa Podles, Irina Arkhipova, Galina Vishnevskaya, Brigitte Fassbaender, Anja Silja and Yevgeny Nesterenko.

Versions by others
1882, Alexander Glazunov and Nikolai Rimsky-Korsakov
The songs were first orchestrated by Glazunov (Nos. 1 and 3) and Rimsky-Korsakov (Nos. 2 and 4) shortly after Mussorgsky's death. They were published in 1882. Mussorgsky had intended to orchestrate the cycle himself but never realised the ambition. In the Glazunov/Rimsky-Korsakov orchestration, 'Trepak' is first.
1962, Dmitri Shostakovich
Shostakovich orchestrated the whole cycle for the dedicatee, soprano Galina Vishnevskaya.  Seven years later, noting that he wanted to continue Mussorgsky's "too short" set of songs, he wrote his Fourteenth Symphony for soprano, bass and chamber orchestra, adding to the musical gallery of death's appearances. The Shostakovich orchestration had a substantial influence on many of his later works, and has since been adapted for bass and baritone voices.
1966 (pub.), Samuil Feinberg
Serenade transcribed for solo piano.
1983, Edison Denisov
Version for bass and orchestra, premiered and recorded by Yevgeny Nesterenko with Gennady Rozhdestvensky conducting in 1985.
1984, Kalevi Aho
Version for bass and orchestra.
1994, Ramon Lazkano
Version for voice and small orchestra, premiered by Dmitri Hvorostovsky with Louis Langrée conducting in the same year.
2007, Alexander Raskatov
Version for bass (or tenor) and orchestra, with 3 optional interludes (Steady Time) between the movements; premiered by Robert Holl with Reinbert de Leeuw conducting in the same year.
2012, Peter Breiner
Version for orchestra only, recorded by him and the New Zealand Symphony Orchestra on Naxos.

References

External links
 Original libretto as well as Cyrillic option, and English/French translation found here
 

Song cycles by Modest Mussorgsky
Death in music
1875 compositions
1877 compositions
Classical song cycles in Russian